Margaret Mbeiza Kisira (born 18 November 1973) is a Ugandan hotelier, politician and legislator. She is the district woman representative for Kaliro District in the parliament of Uganda. She is a member of the National Resistance Movement(NRM) the party in political leadership in Uganda under the chairmanship of Yoweri Kaguta Museveni president of the republic of Uganda. She was appointed as a state minister for Economic monitoring in 2009 by President museveni her appointment was blocked by the parliament of Uganda.

Education 
Margaret Mbeiza started her primary education from Kaliro Church of Uganda Primary school where sat for her primary leaving examinations (PLE) in 1987, she later joined Wanyange Girls secondary school for her O'level education and she sat her Uganda Certificate of Education (UCE) examinations in 1991 thereafter enrolling to Budoni Secondary School for her A'level education and sat her Uganda Advanced Certificate of Education(UACE) in 1998. She later joined Nkumba University where she graduated with a bachelor's degree of science in tourism.

Career 
Margaret Mbeiza worked under the office of the president as resident district commissioner(RDC) of Mayuge District from 2012 to 2015, she served as Kaliro District woman member of parliament between 2006 and 2011, she also served as speaker for Kamuli District local government between 2001 and 2005. She is Currently the woman member of parliament for Kaliro District from 2016 to date. In parliament she serves on the committee on physical infrastructure.

Personal life 
She is single and her hobbies are listening to music and health and fitness.

See also 

 Parliament of Uganda
 National Resistance Movement
 Kaliro District
 Frederick Ngobi Gume
 Kenneth Lubogo
 List of members of the tenth Parliament of Uganda

References

External link 

 Website of the Parliament of Uganda

Members of the Parliament of Uganda
1973 births
National Resistance Movement politicians
Nkumba University alumni
Living people